Bujan (also Romanized as Būjān) is a village in Balvard Rural District, in the Central District of Sirjan County, Kerman Province, Iran. At the 2006 census, its population was 59, in 19 families.

References 

Populated places in Sirjan County